Nizhny Begenyash (Tübänge Bägänäş) is a rural locality (a village) in Semyonkinsky Selsoviet, Aurgazinsky District, Bashkortostan, Russia. The population was 235 as of 2010. There are 2 streets.

Geography 
Nizhny Begenyash is located 37 km southwest of Tolbazy (the district's administrative centre) by road. Kuzminovka is the nearest rural locality.

References 

Rural localities in Aurgazinsky District